Mian Mahalleh-ye Rudbaneh (also Romanized as Mīān Maḩalleh-ye Rūdbaneh) is a village in Rudboneh Rural District, Rudboneh District, Lahijan County, Gilan Province, Iran. At the 2006 census, its population was 105, in 28 families.

References 

Populated places in Lahijan County